Igor Ivanovich Kshinin (born 13 July 1972 in Volgograd) is a retired male boxer from Russia. He represented his native country at the 1996 Summer Olympics in Atlanta, Georgia, where he was stopped in the second round of the men's heavyweight division (– 91 kg) by Germany's eventual bronze medalist Luan Krasniqi.

References
sports-reference

1972 births
Living people
Heavyweight boxers
Boxers at the 1996 Summer Olympics
Olympic boxers of Russia
Sportspeople from Volgograd
Russian male boxers